In Ohio, State Route 224 may refer to:
U.S. Route 224 in Ohio, the only Ohio highway numbered 224 since about 1933
Ohio State Route 224 (1923), now SR 177